Heihaizi or "black child" is a term applied in China. The term denotes children born outside the One child policy, or generally children who are not registered in the national household registration system.

Background and history 

The desire for China to expand and grow economically following the Cultural Revolution became the driving force behind the One-Child policy because such a goal could not be achieved without slowing population growth and limiting the population to 1.1–1.2 billion by 2000. Implementation of the One-child policy included incentivizing families using privileges regarding education, living accommodations, and access to health care as well as monetary aid.  They also discouraged having more than one child by penalizing families by limiting or removing their access to those same privileges.

These incentives and penalties were used to regulate the number of children allowed and spacing between those children should the family be allowed to have a second child.  They were also used to regulate childbearing years of older couples that decided to get married. While the State Family Planning Bureau sets specific expectations for the One-child policy,  local family-planning departments are in charge of implementation within their own region.  This has led to a wide variation from province to province in the system that governs incentives and penalties used to regulate Chinese families. Minority groups are considered one of the few families that are exempted from the one child limit.

Other exceptions include families where both parents are only children or occupy dangerous jobs. It is also possible that a couple could be permitted a second child if their firstborn is disabled. Outside of these specific exceptions, some families are permitted a second child depending on where they live. Government employees and other city residents face very strict enforcement of the law while rural communities are often granted another child, mostly if their firstborn is female.

The household registration system in China, also called Hukou, works in conjunction with the birth registration process to signify that each child is properly registered.  Registration with Hukou is necessary for the child to acquire the citizenship needed for specific benefits and programs under the One-child policy. In order to register with Hukou, each child must have proper documentation from the public health and local family planning department and a medical birth certificate, both of which are received after birth registration, as well as valid identification of the parents.

Any child whose birth is illegal under then-existing Chinese law is likely to be unreported to the authorities through the required birth registration process, the family register, often to avoid financial or social penalties.  Such unregistered children are termed heihaizi.  Other children of such illegal birth, whose parents choose to properly report the birth and pay the monetary penalty imposed, are not heihaizi.  Being excluded from the family register (in effect, a birth certificate), they do not legally exist and as a result cannot access most public services, such as education and health care, and do not receive protection under the law.

Without birth and Hukou registration, the child cannot inherit or obtain property, receive insurance coverage for medical or social purposes, collect financial aid, or attend school unless financial penalties are paid. These “black-listed children” are also denied many rights when they become adults.  They are unable to apply for  government or other jobs, get married and start a family, or join the armed forces.  Aside from illegal occupation that does not require registration, such as organised crime and prostitution, Heihaizi have the option to remain with their family and assist with private work, such as agriculture or private businesses.

In some parts of China children are conceived and born with the purpose of being sold to people traffickers, usually soon after birth. Traffickers then sell them to wealthy families within China or take them abroad, again, to sell them. These children may be used for factory labour, whilst a large market in child brides and underage brothels also exists for girls in particular.

During the 2000 Chinese census report the number of persons not registered was estimated at 8,052,484 persons, which amounted to 0.65% of the total population at the time.

In cases where contraception fails resulting in an unapproved pregnancy, some women choose not to have an abortion.  These women tend to avoid seeking medical care throughout the pregnancy and during delivery due to the chance they will be forced to have an abortion or the financial penalties they would face.  This has resulted in a high rate of maternal and infant deaths.

Gender 
Due to the One Child Policy and a cultural preference for male over female children, some Chinese women are known to give birth to female children in secret, hoping that a later child will be male.  The male child is then registered as the parents' only child.

A large percentage of heihaizi in China are female, as a result of their expendability in the eyes of Chinese culture. According to Li, Zheng, and Feldmen, a surprise investigation of a Chinese province in 2004 revealed that 70–80% of the 530,000 people found to be unregistered were females. These “nonexistent” females are forced to live in concealment without access to education or medical care unless they are abandoned in an orphanage. As a result of underreporting of more female than male births, population statistics for China are compromised and infant sex ratios are drastically skewed. However, secretly giving birth to a female accounts for only part of compromised population statistics.

While it is illegal in China to participate in sex-selective abortion, it is still widely used, distorting the infant sex ratio and increasing the sex-ratio gap. In some instances where a second child is permitted, it is known that if the firstborn is female, subsequent pregnancies bearing a female will “disappear”, leaving open the option for the family to have a son. Females have become scarce due to the decline in female births which has led to the development of criminal activities involving kidnapping and selling women as brides. This industry could threaten the stability of an already-insecure Chinese population through the rise of HIV and other STDs spread by commercial sex workers. The female population is also declining because the pressure for females to give birth to a son, and the pressure of the secret lives of heihaizi women is so overwhelming, that China has one of the highest suicide rates among adult women in the world.

Dynamics

Origin of the phenomenon 
The emergence of the heihaizi, or “black children”, is primarily a result of overpopulation in China.  During the rule of Mao Zedong, the availability of safer food and water and better living conditions led to a 400% decrease in infant mortality and almost doubling of the average life expectancy from thirty years prior. As a result of a healthier population, China experienced a large growth in population during the 1960s and 1970s.

As a result, Chinese government officials began drawing conclusions regarding the effect of this rapid population growth on their modernizing economy and decided that something must be done. Influenced by Chen Muhua’s goal of “reducing the country’s birth rate to 10% within three years,” a government plan was created in 1979 to limit the number of children a mother could have to two.

Living as a heihaizi
As a heihaizi, a person does not possess a Hukou, “an identifying document, similar in some ways to the American social security card.”  This document is essential for a person to access or use any type of government service, which due to the political structure of China means that hospitals, traveling, education, and in many cases even jobs are not available.

Heihaizi are often forced to work illegal jobs in organized crime, such as prostitution and drug dealing.

Chen v. Holder
Chen v. Holder was a United States Court of Appeals for the Seventh Circuit case in 2009 where Shi Chen, a child born illegally in China against the One-Child policy, fought the United States government for asylum after emigrating from China.  Under the Convention Against Torture act, Chen claimed that the Chinese government was unlawfully infringing on his natural rights as a human, and that the United States was by law required to protect him.  While in China, Chen claimed he was unable to receive any “food and land allocation” that the government would normally give to children born legally. After his family paid a large fine, Chen was given the right to attend school.

After pleading his case and describing the persecution that he will face if he returns to China, Chen received his decision from the Circuit Court judge on April 28, 2010. Although it appeared Chen had faced persecution in China, the Board of Immigration Appeals found that the injustices were not severe enough to warrant action by the United States.  The judicial bodies cited that since Chen was still allowed to attend school and that he was never openly confronted by Chinese government officials, his evidence of persecution was not strong enough to merit any protection from the United States.

Recent Changes to the One-Child Policy

Enacted at the beginning of 2014, changes to the One-Child policy have the potential to greatly change the population demographics of China.  Under the new regulations “couples will be allowed to have two children if one of the parents was an only child.”  Prior to this development, only families where both of the parents were only children had the opportunity to have a second child.

This change in policy may significantly reduce the rate of natural increase of heihaizi, due to the fact that parents will no longer need to hide a second child.

See also
One child policy
Human rights in the People's Republic of China

References

Bibliography

External links
 
 

One-child policy
Birth registration